The 2010–11 Telekom S-League was the 8th season of the Telekom S-League in the Solomon Islands. Koloale won the league for the fourth time and also qualified as the Solomon Islands representative for the 2011–12 OFC Champions League through the 2011 Solomon Islands Champions League Playoff against Solomon Warriors. All matches were played at the hillside ground called Lawson Tama Stadium, with an approximate capacity of 20,000.

Teams
 Hana (Honiara)
 Koloale (Honiara)
 KOSSA (Honiara)
 Malaita Kingz (Malaita)
 Marist Fire (Honiara)
 Real Kakamora (Makira-Ulawa)
 Solomon Warriors (Honiara)
 Western United (Western)

Standings

References

Solomon Islands S-League seasons
Solomon
football
Solomon
football